Toralf is a Norwegian given name that may refer to:

Toralf Arndt (born 1966), German association football player
Toralf Engan (born 1936), Norwegian ski jumper
Toralf Konetzke (born 1972), German association football player
Toralf Lyng (1909–2005), Norwegian sports official
Toralf Sandø (1899–1970), Norwegian film director and actor
John Toralf Steffensen (1919–1996), Norwegian politician
Toralf Tollefsen (1914–1994), Norwegian concert accordionist
Toralf Westermoen (1914–1986), Norwegian developer of high-speed craft